Neochthonius is a genus of pseudoscorpions belonging to the family Chthoniidae.

Species:

Neochthonius amplus 
Neochthonius imperialis 
Neochthonius stanfordianus 
Neochthonius troglodytes

References

Chthoniidae
Pseudoscorpion genera